Bibio varipes is a species of fly in the family Bibionidae. It is found in the Palearctic.

References

Bibionidae
Insects described in 1830
Nematoceran flies of Europe